Domingo Hospital (born 20 March 1958) is a Spanish professional golfer.

Hospital was born in Barcelona. He turned professional in 1982, but spent most of that decade not playing tournament golf, but instead teaching in the Swiss ski resort of Davos, while sustaining a parallel career as an airline pilot. In the early 1990s he devoted himself to tournament play, and became the European Tour's then-oldest rookie when he came through qualifying school in 1992.

Hospital subsequently played on the tour full-time until 2001. His best result came in his debut season, when he finished joint runner-up at the Madrid Open behind Des Smyth, a result which retained his card in his final event of the year. However, his most consistent season was 1996, when he twice finished third and ended 37th on the Order of Merit.

In 2008 Hospital turned 50 and joined the European Senior Tour, enjoying a successful debut season culminating in a 10th place finish on the Order of Merit. He won his first Senior tournament in 2010 at the Sicilian Senior Open.

Hospital's nephew, Agustín Domingo, is also a professional golfer who has played on the European Tour.

Professional wins (1)

European Senior Tour wins (1)

European Senior Tour playoff record (1–0)

Results in major championships

Note: Hospital only played in The Open Championship.

"T" = tied

References

External links

Spanish male golfers
Golfers from Catalonia
European Tour golfers
European Senior Tour golfers
Commercial aviators
Sportspeople from Barcelona
1958 births
Living people
20th-century Spanish people
21st-century Spanish people